Gustavsberg may refer to:
Gustavsberg, Sundsvall  Municipality, an urban area in Sundsvall Municipality, Sweden
Gustavsberg, Värmdö Municipality, an urban area and seat of Värmdö Municipality, Sweden
Gustavsberg porcelain, produced in Värmdö